Gavin Richard Harrison (born 28 May 1963) is an English musician. He is best known for playing with the progressive rock bands Porcupine Tree (2002–2010; 2021–present), King Crimson (2008, and 2014–present) and The Pineapple Thief (2016–present). Harrison's drumming has received many awards from music publications and earned praise from other musicians.

Career
Gavin started to work professionally in 1979. He worked as a freelance session drummer on records and tours for the following artists: Incognito, Lisa Stansfield, Lewis Taylor, Artful Dodger, Paul Young, Iggy Pop, Level 42, Porcupine Tree, OSI, King Crimson, Shooter, Dizrhythmia, The Pineapple Thief, The Kings Of Oblivion, Sam Brown, Tom Robinson, Go West, Black, Gail Ann Dorsey, B J Cole, Dave Stewart and Barbara Gaskin, Nathan East, Yasuaki Shimizu, Camouflage, Kevin Ayers, Claudio Baglioni, Franco Battiato, Chizuko Yoshihiro, Renaissance, Mick Karn, Eros Ramazzotti, Nick Johnston, Randy Goodrum, and Fates Warning.

In 2002 he joined Porcupine Tree and has played on the band's albums released since that time: In Absentia, Deadwing, Fear of a Blank Planet,  The Incident, and Closure/Continuation, with each receiving critical acclaim and raising the band's status to one of the most influential modern progressive rock bands. He remained a permanent member of the band until an indefinite hiatus was announced in 2010, and then again in 2021 when the band announced a return to playing together with the release of the album Closure/Continuation.

In 2007 Harrison began a long term collaboration with singer/extended range bass player 05Ric, which led to the release of three CDs, Drop (2007), Circles (2009) and The Man Who Sold Himself (2012).

In 2008, Harrison joined King Crimson as part of a dual-drummer line-up with Pat Mastelotto. He played a number of shows in the United States in August with the band. He also recorded drums on Steven Wilson's debut solo album, Insurgentes.

On 23 August 2011, he was a featured performer on the 'Late Show with David Letterman' as part of their second "Drum Solo Week", along with such players as Sheila E, Stewart Copeland, Neil Peart, and Dennis Chambers.

From September 2014 to December 2021, Harrison played live in King Crimson, as one of the three drummers.

In 2016, he joined The Pineapple Thief as a session drummer for the band's 11th studio album Your Wilderness, which received widespread critical acclaim and an overwhelmingly positive fan reception. He joined the band on the tour following the album in January 2017. In August 2018, just prior to the release of Dissolution, the band announced that Harrison had officially joined the band as a full member. He has since been actively involved and credited in the band's songwriting and album production together with the founder Bruce Soord.

Influences and awards
Harrison was influenced by his father's jazz collection and by drummers such as Steve Gadd and Jeff Porcaro.

Harrison won the Modern Drummer readers' poll for "best progressive drummer of the year" consecutively from 2007–2010 and again in 2016 and 2019. He won "Best Prog Drummer" in DRUM USA magazine 2011. Prog voted him best drummer in 2011, 2012, 2018, 2019, 2020, 2021 and 2022. He is the featured cover story on Modern Drummer January 2009, February 2015 and July 2022. Rolling Stone polls rate him as the third best drummer in the past 25 years. In 2014, Modern Drummer magazine placed Harrison in the "Top 50 Greatest Drummers of All Time".

Comments from other artists
Many artists have cited Harrison as an influence, including Chad Szeliga, Chris Pennie, Ryan Van Poederooyen, Dirk Verbeuren, Andrew Spence, Raymond Hearne of Haken, John Merryman of Cephalic Carnage, Jamie Saint Merat of Ulcerate, Aaron Stechauner of Rings of Saturn, Baard Kolstad of Leprous, Francesco Paoli of Fleshgod Apocalypse, Matija Dagović of Consecration, Vishnu Reddy of Crypted and Abhay Rathore (former Mocaine).

In addition, other artists have been quoted expressing admiration for his work including Neil Peart, Bill Bruford, Mike Portnoy, Devin Townsend, Steve Smith, Martín López, Matt Garstka, Dave Bainbridge, Hannes Grossmann, Blake Richardson, Kai Hahto, Jimmy Keegan, Ian Mosley, Dan Presland of Ne Obliviscaris, Evan Sammons of Last Chance to Reason, Bodo Stricker of Callejon, Joshua Theriot of Abigail's Ghost, and Blake Anderson of Vektor.

Publications
Harrison authored two instructional drum books entitled Rhythmic Illusions and Rhythmic Perspectives. He also wrote and produced his own instructional DVDs, Rhythmic Visions and Rhythmic Horizons, at his home studio. 2010 saw the release of Rhythmic Designs, a book of transcriptions by Terry Branam, and a 3-hour DVD of Gavin's explanations and demonstrations. It won 'Best in Show' at the summer NAMM show in the USA. 2014 sees the release of Rhythmic Compositions a book of 20 detailed drum transcriptions (by Terry Branam) of recorded Porcupine Tree performances – plus photos and stories of the recording and creative process.

Discography

See also
List of drummers
List of jazz drummers

References

External links
Gavin's official website
Gavin's Drummerworld.com page

Living people
1963 births
English drummers
British male drummers
People from Harrow, London
King Crimson members
Progressive rock drummers
OSI (band) members
Porcupine Tree members
The Tangent members
Renaissance (band) members
Incognito (band) members